Penticton Water Aerodrome, formerly , also known as Penticton Seaplane Base, was located  south of Penticton, British Columbia, Canada.

The airport was classified as an airport of entry by Nav Canada and was staffed by the Canada Border Services Agency (CBSA). CBSA officers at this airport were able to handle general aviation aircraft only, with no more than 15 passengers.

See also
 List of airports in the Okanagan

References

Defunct seaplane bases in British Columbia
Regional District of Okanagan-Similkameen
Airports in the Okanagan
Buildings and structures in Penticton